General Sir Walter Norris Congreve,  (20 November 1862 – 28 February 1927), was a British Army officer in the Second Boer War and the First World War, and Governor of Malta from 1924 to 1927. He received the Victoria Cross, the highest award for gallantry in the face of the enemy that can be awarded to British and Commonwealth forces.

Early life
Walter Norris Congreve was the son of William and Fanny E. Congreve of Castle Church, Stafford. He was educated at Twyford School, Harrow School and Pembroke College, Oxford.

Early military career
Congreve was commissioned a lieutenant in the Rifle Brigade on 7 February 1885 and promoted to captain on 6 December 1893.

Second Boer War
The Second Boer War started in October 1899 with a Boer offensive into the British-held Natal and Cape Colony areas. Congreve arrived in South Africa and was posted as a brigade major in the Ladysmith relief force. He was present at the Battle of Colenso when British troops commanded by Sir Redvers Buller attempted to cross the Tugela River to relieve the besieged city of Ladysmith. The Boers repelled all their attempts to cross the river, and the British were forced to retreat in one of their biggest defeats of the war.

Action at Colenso
On 15 December 1899 at the Battle of Colenso, Captain Congreve with several others, tried to save the guns of the 14th and 66th Batteries, Royal Field Artillery, when the detachments serving the guns had all become casualties or been driven from their guns. Some of the horses and drivers were sheltering in a donga (gully) about 500 yards behind the guns and the intervening space was swept with shell and rifle fire. Captain Congreve, with two other officers (Frederick Roberts and Harry Norton Schofield), and Corporal George Nurse retrieved two of the guns. All four received the VC for this action. (Roberts was the son in one of the two other father and son pairs of VC winners.) Then, although wounded himself, seeing one of the officers fall, Congreve went out with Major William Babtie, RAMC, who also received the VC for this action, and brought in the wounded man. His citation read:

Later service in South Africa
Wounded, Congreve did not take part in the actual relief of Ladysmith in February 1900, but he was back in service later that year, and served as a staff officer. He served as adjutant in a newly established colonial mounted infantry regiment which, with the leave of Lord Roberts, was named after his chief of staff, "Kitcheners Horse". Kitcheners' Horse was employed, with distinction, in the operations undertaken by Lord Roberts in February 1900 for the relief of Kimberley and his advance on Bloemfontein and later Pretoria. Lord Kitchener took over the chief command of British forces in South Africa in November 1900, and appointed Congreve his personal secretary. He was promoted to major on 21 December 1901, and on the next day received a brevet promotion as lieutenant-colonel in recognition of services in South Africa. Following the end of hostilities in early June 1902, he left Cape Town on board the SS Orotava together with Lord Kitchener, and arrived at Southampton the next month. He was mentioned in a despatch by Lord Kitchener in June 1902.

Command posts in the United Kingdom
After the Boer War, Congreve held a series of command posts in Britain and Ireland. In November 1902 he joined the Staff of the 3rd Army Corps in Ireland as he was appointed Assistant Military Secretary and Aide-de-Camp to the Commander-in-Chief of the corps, the Duke of Connaught.

First World War

At the outbreak of the First World War in August 1914, Congreve was a brigadier-general, commanding the 18th Brigade, which was on manoeuvres in Wales at the time. Although suffering from asthma, he deployed with the formation in the British Expeditionary Force (BEF) to France, taking part in the Battle of the Aisne.

The division was stationed near Neuve Chapelle when Congreve's men took part in the 1914 Christmas truce. In a letter written on Christmas Day itself, Brigadier-General Congreve wrote recalling how the Germans opposite his lines initiated by calling a truce earlier the same day, how one of his men got out over the parapet to meet in no man's land, and how officers and men exchanged cigars and cigarettes. Congreve admitted he was reluctant to personally witness the scene of the truce for fear he would be a prime target for German snipers.

The Somme: Delville Wood

Congreve commanded the 6th Division from May 1915 and then XIII Corps from November 1915. As commander of XIII Corps, Congreve led the battles for Longueval and Delville Wood between 14 July and 3 September 1916. The rapid advance of his corps in the southern sector of the Somme offensive had brought about a situation where the allied front was set at a right angle – the left sector facing north and the right, facing east from Delville Wood. This meant that an advance on a wide front would result in the attacking forces diverging as they advanced. In order to "straighten the line," General Sir Douglas Haig, Commander-in-Chief (C-in-C) of the BEF, had decided to exploit the advances which had been made by Congreve in the south by taking and holding the town of Longueval and Delville Wood. Being on fairly high ground and providing good spotting opportunities for artillery fire, an occupied Longueval would protect the right flank and allow the Allies to advance in the north and align their left with that of Congreve's XIII Corps on the right. XIII Corps succeeded in securing Delville Wood, but it was one of the bloodiest confrontations of the Somme, with both sides incurring large casualties. During the war, Congreve lost a hand in action.

Later life

Congreve continued his war service becoming General Officer Commanding VII Corps in 1918. Later Congreve rose to the rank of general and was knighted. He was General Officer Commanding the Egyptian Expeditionary Force between 1919 and 1923 and then Commander-in-Chief Southern Command between 1923 and 1924.

From 1924 to 1927, he served as the governor of Malta, where he died. At his request, he was buried at sea in the channel between the coast and Filfla Island; there is a small monument to him on the coast between Hamrija Tower and the prehistoric site of Mnajdra; the channel between Malta and Filfla is known as Congreve Channel (the official name is 'Il-Fliegu ta' Filfla').

One of the three school houses of St. Edward's College in Cottonera, Malta, a Catholic school for boys founded in 1929 is also named after Congreve. The other two being Campbell and Ducane, after General David Campbell and Sir John Philip Du Cane, all former governor-generals of Malta.

There is also a stone bearing his name above the gate to the "Scouts" HQ in Floriana, just outside the capital Valletta.

From 1903 to 1924, Congreve had a home in Shropshire at West Felton Grange. His service in the First World War is recorded, with that of his son William, in a Roll of Honour book in St Michael's Church at West Felton.

Family
Congreve married at St Jude's Church, Kensington, on 18 May 1890, Cecilia Henrietta Dolores Blount La Touche. Lady Congreve was a nurse in the First World War, and a poet and author of "The Firewood Poem".

They were the parents of Major Billy Congreve – they are one of only three father and son pairs to win a VC. Their younger son Geoffrey Cecil Congreve was created a baronet, of Congreve in the County of Stafford, in July 1927 (see Congreve baronets).

Victoria Cross
Congreve's Victoria Cross is on display at the Royal Green Jackets (Rifles) Museum, Winchester, England.

Citations
 
 
David Harvey, Monuments to Courage, 1999
The Register of the Victoria Cross (This England, 1997)
Ian Uys, Victoria Crosses of the Anglo-Boer War, 2000

References

External links

 Angloboerwar.com

 

|-
 

|-

|-

|-

 

|-

1862 births
1927 deaths
British recipients of the Victoria Cross
Second Boer War recipients of the Victoria Cross
British Army generals of World War I
Deputy Lieutenants of Staffordshire
Knights Commander of the Order of the Bath
Members of the Royal Victorian Order
British Army generals
Burials at sea
Governors and Governors-General of Malta
People educated at Harrow School
Rifle Brigade officers
British Army personnel of the Second Boer War
People from Chatham, Kent
Alumni of Pembroke College, Oxford
Chevaliers of the Légion d'honneur
Knights of Grace of the Order of St John
People educated at Twyford School
British Army recipients of the Victoria Cross
Participants of the Christmas truce of 1914
Military personnel from Kent